Australaphodius is a genus of aphodiine dung beetles in the family Scarabaeidae. There are at least four described species in Australaphodius.

Species
These four species belong to the genus Australaphodius:
 Australaphodius accola (Kolbe, 1908)
 Australaphodius frenchi (Blackburn, 1892)
 Australaphodius muellerae Bordat, 1990

References

Further reading

 
 
 

Scarabaeidae
Articles created by Qbugbot